Hodovytsia is a village in Lviv Raion, Lviv Oblast in western Ukraine. It belongs to Solilnyky rural hromada, one of the hromadas of Ukraine.

Until 18 July 2020, Hodovytsia belonged to Pustomyty Raion. The raion was abolished in July 2020 as part of the administrative reform of Ukraine, which reduced the number of raions of Lviv Oblast to seven. The area of Pustomyty Raion was merged into Lviv Raion.

References

Notes

Sources
 Історія міст і сіл Української РСР: В 26 т. Львівська область / АН УРСР. Ін-т історії; Голов. редкол.: П. Т. Тронько (голова) та ін. — К. : Голов. ред. УРЕ АН УРСР, 1968. — 980 с.

Populated places established in the 1370s
Villages in Lviv Raion